Menace to Society is the second studio album by the heavy metal band Killers, featuring former Iron Maiden singer Paul Di'Anno.

Musical style 
Unlike most of Paul Di'Anno's works, this work is more aggressive and slower. Here the classic heavy metal is replaced by groove metal with elements of thrash. The song "Die by the Gun" has been compared to "Mouth for War" by Pantera.

Track listing 
"Advance and Be Recognised" – 1:06
"Die by the Gun" – 4:01
"Menace to Society" – 2:51
"?" – 5:04
"Think Brutal" – 4:03
"Past Due" – 4:52
"Faith Healer" – 6:14
"Chemical Imbalance" – 4:39
"A Song for You" – 4:23
"Three Words" – 5:47
"Conscience" – 5:38
"City of Fools" – 3:08

Personnel 
Paul Di'Anno – vocals, producer
Cliff Evans – guitars
Gavin Cooper – bass
Steve Hopgood – drums, producer, mixing

References 

 j-card from Metal Blade release 3984-14083-4 (cassette liner notes)

1994 albums
Paul Di'Anno albums
Albums produced by Kevin Ridley